The Leisure and Cultural Services Department (LCSD), is a department in the Government of Hong Kong. It reports to the Culture, Sports & Tourism Bureau, headed by the Secretary for Culture, Sports and Tourism. It provides leisure and cultural activities for the people of Hong Kong, which was also one of the tasks of the former Urban Council, and Regional Council and Home Affairs Bureau. It manages various public facilities around Hong Kong including public libraries, swimming pools, and sports centres. The well-known Hong Kong Cultural Centre and Hong Kong Space Museum are among several museums also managed by the department. It was established in 2000 and its headquarters is in Shatin, New Territories.

The department was previously headed by the Secretary for Home Affairs before July 2022.

List of directors for LCSD
 Thomas Chow Tat-ming (2000–2009)
 Betty Fung Ching Suk-yee, JP (2009–2014)
 Michelle Li Mei-sheung, JP (2014–2019)
 Vincent LIU Ming-kwong, JP

Facilities and services

Museums

 Flagstaff House Museum of Teaware
 Hong Kong Film Archive
 Hong Kong Heritage Museum
 Hong Kong Museum of Art
 Hong Kong Museum of Coastal Defence
 Hong Kong Museum of History
 Hong Kong Railway Museum
 Hong Kong Science Museum
 Hong Kong Space Museum
 Hong Kong Visual Arts Centre
 Law Uk Folk Museum
 Lei Cheng Uk Han Tomb Museum
 Sam Tung Uk Museum
 Sheung Yiu Folk Museum

Parks

Most public parks and gardens are managed by the Leisure and Cultural Services Department.

Public libraries

Hong Kong Public Libraries (HKPL) consists of 67 static and 10 mobile libraries offering a total collection of 12.3 million items of books, audio/video materials, newspapers and periodicals, etc. Among the most significant libraries are the Hong Kong Central Library, Kowloon Public Library, and Sha Tin Public Library.

Sports and fitness

The LCSD operates two stadia (Hong Kong Stadium and Mong Kok Stadium) and numerous sports grounds, indoor sporting halls and courts, and public swimming pools. It also manages and provides lifeguards at gazetted beaches.

Sports Subvention Scheme
Under the Sports Subvention Scheme, the LCSD provides recurrent subvention to 58 national sports associations (NSAs) in Hong Kong, at levels ranging from around HK$0.5 million to HK$10 million (in 2011–12). Until 2004–2005, NSAs received subventions from the statutory Hong Kong Sports Development Board.  NSAs are members of the Sports Federation and Olympic Committee of Hong Kong, China, which is the National Olympic Committee in Hong Kong responsible for the co-ordination of all local sports organizations and promotion of sports in Hong Kong.

See also
 Hong Kong cultural policy
 The former Urban Council and Urban Services Department
 The former Regional Council and Regional Services Department
Home Affairs Bureau

References

Hong Kong government departments and agencies